The Best of the Pink Floyd, also issued as Masters of Rock, is a compilation album of early Pink Floyd music, concentrating on singles and album tracks from 1967 to 1968.

Later release
Later editions titled Masters of Rock were released in 1974 in France, Germany, Italy, and the Netherlands, to capitalise on the success of The Dark Side of the Moon.  It is one of the Masters of Rock series of budget EMI compilations with identical titles, each volume for a different artist. Two different sleeve designs were used: one (by Herman Baas) based on the picture from the centre of the album sleeve for Meddle, with Syd Barrett's face superimposed over the original photo of David Gilmour, who had not yet joined the band during most of the period covered by the album; and a later edition with the title filling the front cover.  The latter edition is titled Masters of Rock, Volume 1; subsequent volumes of Masters of Rock featured other artists.

Song variations
There are no song variations between the original Best of edition and the Masters of Rock LPs.
Both The Best of edition and Masters of Rock are made from the same master tape and matrix (5C 054-04299) and were notable for containing the first stereo release of "Apples and Oranges" and "Paintbox", this latter also appearing a year later on Relics.

However, The French edition of Masters of Rock, released in 1974, contains the stereo mix of "Julia Dream" as in Relics.

These albums were also the only LP source of "It Would Be So Nice" prior to the era of CD re-issues and compilations. The version of "It Would Be So Nice" appearing on these albums is the single version, with lyrics mentioning "the Daily Standard" (no known version with "the Evening Standard" has ever been released).

Counterfeit editions with different track lists exist.  Any edition with a track list that does not match the list shown here, is a counterfeit.

Track listing
All songs written and sung by Syd Barrett, and taken from singles, except where noted.

Personnel
Syd Barrett – guitar (all but 7, 9), lead vocals (all but 7, 8, 9), backing vocals
David Gilmour – guitar (7, 9), lead vocals (9), backing vocals (uncredited)
Nick Mason – drums, percussion
Roger Waters – bass guitar, gong (1), backing vocals
Richard Wright – keyboards, piano, organ, mellotron (7, 9), cello (1, 5), flute (5), harmonium (1), electric harpsichord (10), recorder (7), lead vocals (2, 7, 8), backing vocals (however erroneously credited for playing bass guitar)

Certifications

References

Albums produced by Joe Boyd
Albums produced by Norman Smith (record producer)
Pink Floyd compilation albums
1970 greatest hits albums
Columbia Records compilation albums